Tillandsia rhodosticta is a species of flowering plant in the family Bromeliaceae. It is endemic to Ecuador.  Its natural habitats are subtropical or tropical moist lowland forests and subtropical or tropical moist montane forests. It is threatened by habitat loss.

References

Flora of Ecuador
rhodosticta
Vulnerable plants
Taxonomy articles created by Polbot